Ait Tamlil is a mountainous village and rural commune in Azilal Province of the Tadla-Azilal region of Morocco. It is located north by road from Toufghine. At the time of the 2004 census, the commune had a total population of 18720 people living in 2453 households.

References

Populated places in Azilal Province
Rural communes of Béni Mellal-Khénifra